Soña Libré is a 1962 album by Cal Tjader.

Reception

Billboard magazine reviewed the album in their May 25, 1963 issue and wrote that on the album Tjader has "a solid collection of tracks that have swing and a quiet insistent sound".

Track listing 
 "Hip Walk" (Cal Tjader) – 2:33
 "Sally's Tomato" (Tjader) – 3:14
 "O Barquinho (The Little Boat)" (Ronaldo Boscoli, Roberto Menescal) – 4:24
 "El Muchacho" (Herbert Owen Reed) – 2:59
 "Insight" (Bill Fitch) – 5:35
 "My Reverie" (Larry Clinton, Claude Debussy) – 2:44
 "Manhã de Carnaval" (Luiz Bonfá, Antônio Maria) – 6:17
 "Azul" (Tjader) – 2:47
 "Invitation" (Bronisław Kaper, Paul Francis Webster) – 4:08
 "Alonzo" (Lonnie Hewitt) – 4:21

Personnel 
Cal Tjader – vibraphone
Clare Fischer – electronic organ, piano
Freddy Schreiber – double bass
Bill Fitch – congas
Johnny Rae – drums, timbales
Creed Taylor – producer

References

1963 albums
Albums produced by Creed Taylor
Cal Tjader albums
Verve Records albums